Vasco Ramires Jr. (born 28 September 1964) is a Portuguese equestrian. He competed in two events at the 1992 Summer Olympics.

References

1964 births
Living people
Portuguese male equestrians
Olympic equestrians of Portugal
Equestrians at the 1992 Summer Olympics
Sportspeople from Lisbon